The 2020 Irish budget was the Irish Government Budget for the 2020 fiscal year was presented to Dáil Éireann on 8 October 2019 by Minister for Finance Paschal Donohoe, his third as Minister for Finance.

Summary

Brexit		
A Brexit package of €1.2 billion was announced. In the event of a no-deal the following measures will be deployed,
€220 million will be deployed immediately.
€650 million for agriculture, enterprise and tourism sectors to assist the regions and populations most affected.
€85 million for beef farmers and €6 million for other livestock farmers and the mushroom sectors.
€14 million for the fishing industry.
€5 million for the food and drinks processing industry.
€365 million for extra social protection expenditure benefit.
€45 million to assist people to transition to new work.

Other
Carbon tax is up €6 to €26 per tonne
Health spending is up €1 billion to €17.4 billion. Free GP care for children under eight and free dental care for children under six from September.
€11 billion will be provided to the Department of Education in 2020.
Christmas bonus to all social welfare recipients in 2019.
€80 million for housing assistance payment.
50 cent increase on a packet of 20 cigarettes from midnight
€1.5 billion will be transferred to the Government's rainy day fund

References

External links
2020 Irish budget at Irish Independent

2019 in Irish politics
Budget
2020 government budgets
2020 in Irish politics
Budget
32nd Dáil
19
October 2020 events in Ireland